The Richard and Mettle Ealy House is a historic house at 280 Solomon Grove Road in Twin Groves, Arkansas.  It is a single story masonry structure, built out of sandstone with cream-colored brick trim.  It has a cross-gable roof configuration, and a recessed porch with an arcade of rounded arches.  It was built in 1942, replacing a wood-frame home destroyed by fire.  It was built by Silas Owens, Sr., a local master mason, for his first cousin and wife.

The house was listed on the National Register of Historic Places in 2005.

See also
National Register of Historic Places listings in Faulkner County, Arkansas

References

Houses on the National Register of Historic Places in Arkansas
Houses completed in 1942
Houses in Faulkner County, Arkansas
1942 establishments in Arkansas
National Register of Historic Places in Faulkner County, Arkansas